The heavyweight was the heaviest boxing weight class held as part of the boxing at the 1904 Summer Olympics programme. It was the first time the event, like all other boxing events, was held in Olympic competition.

Results

References

Sources
 

Heavyweight